Workshy is an English band formed in London in 1986 by Michael McDermott, Chrysta Jones and Kevin Kehoe (who left in 1992).  They are perhaps best known for their songs “Never The Same” and “You’re The Summer” as well as covers of the Bacharach/David song “I Say A Little Prayer”, “If I Ever Lose This Heaven” and Carole King’s "It's Too Late".

The band was signed by UK-based Magnet Records in June 1987 and released their debut album The Golden Mile in 1989.

All Workshy's back catalogue was released for download in 2011. They released a new single for download in 2012, "In This Neighbourhood" (unplugged) - a reworking of one of their earlier tracks.

Discography
 The Golden Mile (1989) 
 Ocean (1992) 
 Heaven (1993) 
 Soul Love (1994) 
 Under the Influence (1995) 
 Allure (1998) 
 Free'n Easy (1998) 
 Clear (2000) 
 Mood (2002) 
 Smile Again (2007) 
 Bittersweet (2011) 
 Wayward (Manana, 2017) 
 Love Soul (Manana, 2020)

References

External links
Workshy

English pop music groups
Musical groups from London
Musical groups established in 1986
1986 establishments in England